Sick Girl may refer to:

Sick Girl (film), a 2008 American film
"Sick Girl" (Masters of Horror), 10th episode of the first season of Masters of Horror
The Sick Girl, or The Sick Child, painting by Gabriël Metsu